Ville Koho (born 27 February 1982) is a Finnish ice hockey player who currently plays professionally in Finland for SaiPa of the SM-liiga. Serving as team captain, he has never represented any other Finnish team during his career which begun in season 2001–02.

Career statistics

Regular season and playoffs

References

External links

 

Living people
SaiPa players
1982 births
Finnish ice hockey centres
People from Imatra
Sportspeople from South Karelia